Zilong Township is a rural township in Lengshuijiang, Loudi City, Hunan Province, People's Republic of China.

Administrative division
The township is divided into  villages and  community, the following areas: Dishui Village, Linchang Village, Qianjin Village, Wujia Village, Yangqiao Village, Yangxin Village, Zhoutou Village, and Ziping Village (滴水村、林场村、前进村、吴家村、杨桥村、杨新村、周头村、梓坪村).

Historic township-level divisions of Lengshuijiang